Guadalupe Reservoir is a reservoir in Santa Clara County, California, United States, about  south of the city of San Jose, California. The reservoir is located along Hicks Road on Guadalupe Creek, a tributary of the Guadalupe River. The Guadalupe River was named Rio de Nuestra Señora de Guadalupe on March 30, 1776, by the de Anza expedition, in honor of the Mexican saint who was the principal patron saint of the expedition. Guadalupe dam and reservoir, constructed in 1935, is one of the six original systems approved for construction by voters in 1934.

The California Office of Environmental Health Hazard Assessment (OEHHA) has developed a safe eating advisory for the reservoir, stating no one should eat any fish caught there.

See also
List of lakes in California
List of lakes in the San Francisco Bay Area

References

External links
 Local Dams and Reservoirs | Santa Clara Valley Water

Reservoirs in California
Reservoirs in Santa Clara County, California
Reservoirs in Northern California